is a Japanese golfer.

Nakamura was born in Osaka. He won 20 tournaments on the Japan Golf Tour and ranks eighth on the career victories list.

Professional wins (28)

Japan Golf Tour wins (20)

*Note: The 1988 Gene Sarazen Jun Classic was shortened to 63 holes due to rain.

Japan Golf Tour playoff record (3–5)

Other wins (8)
1973 Okinawa Classic
1975 Young Lions
1976 All Star
1977 All Star
1982 Kobe-Gifu Open, ???
1984 Kobe-Gifu Open
1989 Kuzuha International

Team appearances
World Cup (representing Japan): 1973
Four Tours World Championship (representing Japan): 1987, 1989

See also
List of golfers with most Japan Golf Tour wins

External links

Japanese male golfers
Japan Golf Tour golfers
Sportspeople from Osaka Prefecture
1950 births
Living people